DXFH-TV, channel 23, was the flagship station of Philippine television network ABS-CBN Sports and Action (S+A), a fully owned subsidiary of AMCARA Broadcasting Network. The station's studios and transmitter are located at the ABS-CBN Broadcast Center, San Jose Road, Zamboanga City.

On May 5, 2020, S+A Zambaoanga went off-air, together with ABS-CBN and MOR, due to cease-and-desist order from the National Telecommunications Commission after its legislative franchise expired the previous day.

See also
S+A stations
DXFH-FM
DXLL-TV

References

ABS-CBN Sports and Action stations
Television channels and stations established in 1997
Television channels and stations disestablished in 2020